The 2012 United States motorcycle Grand Prix (formally known as the 2012 Red Bull U.S. Grand Prix) was the tenth round of the 2012 Grand Prix motorcycle racing season and the first of two races in the 2012 season to take place in the United States of America. It was held on 29 July at the Laguna Seca Raceway in Monterey, California.

Jorge Lorenzo qualified on pole position for the race, which was won by Casey Stoner.

MotoGP classification

Championship standings after the race (MotoGP)
Below are the standings for the top five riders and constructors after round ten has concluded.

Riders' Championship standings

Constructors' Championship standings

 Note: Only the top five positions are included for both sets of standings.

References

United States motorcycle Grand Prix
United States
United States Motorcycle Grand Prix
United States Motorcycle Grand Prix
United States motorcycle Grand Prix